Illoinen (Finnish; Illois in Swedish) is a district of the city of Turku, in Finland. It is located in the western part of the island of Hirvensalo, off the city's coastline.

Illoinen is one of the smallest districts of Turku, with a population of only 85. The population is decreasing at an annual rate of 1.18%. 21.18% of the district's population are under 15 years old, while 15.29% are over 65. 100% of the district's inhabitants speak Finnish as their native language.

See also
 Districts of Turku
 Districts of Turku by population

Districts of Turku